Doña Ana Community College is a public community college with several campuses in Doña Ana County, New Mexico. It was established in 1973 at the request of the Gadsden, Hatch, and Las Cruces school boards to provided vocational and technical education opportunities to the citizens of Doña Ana County. It is independently accredited by The Higher Learning Commission. The community college offers instruction leading to associate degrees and technical certificates and preparation for further academic work. It is a branch of New Mexico State University. Doña Ana Community College has six campuses, with three in Las Cruces, and one each in Anthony, Sunland Park, and Chaparral. Dual credit classes are also offered in conjunction with local high schools.

As of 2017, the school had 10,644 credit students (including part-time) and 3,498 non-credit students.

Campus
Doña Ana Community College has six campuses and centers located throughout Doña Ana County. Espina and East Mesa Campuses and the Workforce Center are located in Las Cruces. The Gadsden campus is located in Anthony, with Sunland Park, and Chaparral campuses located in their respective communities in the southern part of Doña Ana County.

The East Mesa Campus located on the northeast side of Las Cruces and houses most of the general education programs, criminal justice, culinary, business, creative media, and information technology programs. The Espina Campus is located on the west side of the New Mexico State University main campus, and is the main location for the health and trades programs. The Workforce Center is located in central Las Cruces and offers customized training for employee development and career and technical training, such as truck driving and industry certifications. The Gadsden Center located in the southeastern portion of the county offers general education and adult education programs. The Sunland Park Center in Santa Teresa offers general education, adult basic education, and welding. The Chaparral location offers classes in adult basic education and continuing education. Dual credit programs are also offered in conjunction with local high schools.

Accreditation

The school is accredited by the Higher Learning Commission. Several programs at Doña Ana Community College have specialized accreditation:

American Dental Association – Commission on Dental Accreditation
American Design Drafting Association
American Welding Society
Accreditation Commission on Education in Nursing
Accreditation Council for Business Schools and Programs
Commission on Accreditation for Respiratory Care
Commission on Accreditation of Allied Health Education Programs
International Fire Service Accreditation Congress
Joint Review Committee on Education in Radiologic Technology
Joint Review Commission for Education in Diagnostic Medical Sonography
Automotive Service Excellence Education Foundation
The National Center for Construction Education and Research

Nursing program 
In 2012, the National League for Nursing Accrediting Commission revoked accreditation for the college's nursing program. Although the New Mexico Board of Nursing permitted the program to continue, accreditation is a prerequisite for employment in most hospitals and acceptance into other nursing programs, such as the one at New Mexico State. In 2010 the school had been placed on warning status by the commission for having an inadequate ratio of qualified instructors. A lawsuit filed in 2013 by eight nursing students alleges that the school had not notified students of the warning, and had been made aware of the problem as early as 2002. In May 2015, a state judge ruled that the lawsuit would become a class action, and would include the 100 students enrolled at the time. In August 2015, it was announced that accreditation had been fully restored. This applied retroactively to students who graduated the previous May.

References

External links 
 

New Mexico State University
Community colleges in New Mexico
Education in Doña Ana County, New Mexico
Buildings and structures in Doña Ana County, New Mexico
1973 establishments in New Mexico
Educational institutions established in 1973